Brooke Mackenzie Ellison (born October 20, 1978) is an American politician. She is known for being the first quadriplegic to graduate from Harvard University.

History
On September 4, 1990, at the age of 11, Brooke was hit by a car while walking home on her first day of junior high school, resulting in her being paralyzed from the neck down.  Although her injuries left her completely dependent on other people, she graduated from Ward Melville High School in 1996 with high honors, and was accepted by Harvard. She graduated summa cum laude from Harvard with a bachelor of science in cognitive neuroscience in 2000, and a master's degree in public policy from Harvard's Kennedy School of Government. In 2004 Rutgers University awarded Brooke Ellison with an honorary doctorate in humane letters.  Ellison completed her Ph.D. in 2015 from Stony Brook University.

In November 2005, Ellison teamed up with director James Siegel to create the winning documentary "Hope Deferred", which aims to educate the general public about embryonic stem cell research.  She is also the author of two books.

The Brooke Ellison Story
The Brooke Ellison Story premiered in 2004, based on Ellison's memoir Miracles Happen: One Mother, One Daughter, One Journey, which she co-wrote with her mother in alternating chapters following her graduation from Harvard.  The television film was directed by fellow quadriplegic Christopher Reeve, the star of Superman.  Brooke was portrayed by Vanessa Marano as a child and Lacey Chabert as a teenager.  It is also notable for being Reeve's final directing project. The film aired on October 25, 2004, just a few weeks after Reeve's death.

Candidate for State Senate
Brooke Ellison ran for New York State Senate as a Democrat in 2006 but was defeated by the Republican incumbent, John Flanagan. Ellison has not commented on whether or not she intends to run for office again. One of Ellison's principal issues is her support for embryonic stem cell research. She serves on the advisory board of the Genetics Policy Institute.

Ellison is also a motivational speaker.

Further reading
Two decades following the publication of Miracles Happen, Ellison authored and published her second book, Look Both Ways.

 Ellison, Brooke and Jean Ellison Miracles Happen: One Mother, One Daughter, One Journey (Hyperion Press, New York 2012). .

References

External links
 
 

Living people
People with tetraplegia
1978 births
Harvard Kennedy School alumni
People from Stony Brook, New York
Ward Melville High School alumni
New York (state) Democrats
Women in New York (state) politics
American politicians with disabilities
Candidates in the 2006 United States elections
21st-century American politicians
21st-century American women politicians
Stony Brook University alumni